Lauri A. Heino (24 August 1918 in Somero – 3 February 2001) was a Finnish soldier, awarded the Mannerheim Cross (2nd class) on 11 November 1943. At the time, he held the rank of sergeant and was serving as a tank driver in the 3rd Company, I Armoured Battalion of the Finnish Armoured Brigade.

Heino was the first foreign soldier to capture an intact Soviet T-34 tank and drive it.

References 
 Knights of the Mannerheim Cross

Finnish military personnel
1918 births
2001 deaths
Tank personnel
Knights of the Mannerheim Cross